In late 2007, the Australian Rugby League and National Rugby League commissioned 130 experts to select the 100 best rugby league players in the game's 100-year history in Australia. From this list, a limited panel of experts picked a "Team of the Century" - a team of 17 players considered to be the best Australian players of all time. This team was announced in Sydney on 17 April 2008, see Australian Rugby League's Team of the Century.

Rugby League's 100 Greatest Players

Players are listed in alphabetical order.
 Vic Armbruster, Mullumbimby, Toowoomba Valleys, Brisbane Grammars, Fortitude Valley, Bundaberg, Rochdale Hornets
 Keith Barnes, Balmain
 Harry Bath, Brisbane Souths, Balmain, Barrow, Warrington, St George
 Jack Beaton, Eastern Suburbs 
 Arthur Beetson, Balmain, Eastern Suburbs, Parramatta, Hull KR
 Brian Bevan, Eastern Suburbs, Warrington, Blackpool Borough
 Cec Blinkhorn, North Sydney, South Sydney
 Kerry Boustead, Eastern Suburbs, Manly, North Sydney, Hull KR
 Dave Brown, Eastern Suburbs, Warrington
 Roy Bull, Manly
 Frank Burge, Glebe, St George
 Joe "Chimpy" Busch, Eastern Suburbs, Balmain
 Billy Cann, South Sydney
 Brian Carlson, Newcastle, North Sydney
 Clive Churchill, South Sydney
 Brian Clay, Newtown, St George
 Arthur Clues, Western Suburbs, Leeds, Hunslet
 Bradley Clyde, Canberra, Bulldogs, Leeds
 Ron Coote, South Sydney, Eastern Suburbs
 Ted "Tedda" Courtney, Newtown, Western Suburbs, North Sydney
 Jimmy Craig, Balmain, University, Western Suburbs
 Michael Cronin, Parramatta
 Les Cubitt, Glebe, Eastern Suburbs
 Laurie Daley, Canberra
 Brian Davies, Brisbane Brothers, Canterbury
 Dan Dempsey, Ipswich
 Graham Eadie, Manly, Halifax
 Andrew Ettingshausen, Cronulla, Leeds
 Viv Farnsworth, Newtown, Western Suburbs
 Brad Fittler, Penrith, Sydney Roosters
 Charles "Chook" Fraser, Balmain
 Dan Frawley, Eastern Suburbs
 Bob Fulton, Manly, Eastern Suburbs, Warrington
 Peter Gallagher, Brisbane Brothers
 Reg Gasnier, St George
 Herb Gilbert, South Sydney, Western Suburbs, Hull FC
 Tom Gorman, Toowoomba, Brisbane Brothers
 Eric Grothe Sr, Parramatta, Leeds
 Duncan Hall, Brisbane Valleys, Toowoomba, Brisbane Wests
 Howard Hallett, South Sydney
 Arthur "Pony" Halloway, Glebe, Eastern Suburbs, Balmain
 Brian Hambly, Wagga Wagga, South Sydney, Parramatta
 Vic Hey, Western Suburbs, Toowoomba, Parramatta
 Keith Holman, Western Suburbs
 Harold Horder, South Sydney, North Sydney
 Ken Irvine, North Sydney, Manly
 Andrew Johns, Newcastle Knights
 Les Johns, Canterbury
 Ken Kearney, St George
 Noel Kelly, Ipswich, Western Suburbs
 Brett Kenny, Parramatta, Wigan
 Johnny King, St George
 Terry Lamb, Western Suburbs, Canterbury
 Allan Langer, Ipswich, Brisbane Broncos, Warrington
 Graeme Langlands, St George
 Glenn Lazarus, Canberra, Brisbane Broncos, Melbourne
 Wally Lewis, Brisbane Valleys, Wynnum-Manly, Wakefield Trinity, Brisbane Broncos, Gold Coast
 Darren Lockyer, Brisbane Broncos
 Eddie Lumsden, Manly, St George
 Mick Madsen, Toowoomba 
 Bob McCarthy, South Sydney, Canterbury
 Chris McKivat, Glebe
 Frank McMillan, Western Suburbs, Balmain
 Mal Meninga, Souths Brisbane, St. Helens, Canberra
 Dally Messenger, Eastern Suburbs
 Gene Miles, Wynnum-Manly, Brisbane Broncos, Wigan
 Steve Mortimer, Canterbury
 Barry Muir, Brisbane Wests
 Herb Narvo, Newtown, St George
 Ernie Norman, Eastern Suburbs
 Andy Norval, Eastern Suburbs
 John O'Neill, South Sydney, Manly
 Kel O'Shea, Western Suburbs
 Joe Pearce, Eastern Suburbs
 Sandy Pearce, Eastern Suburbs
 Wayne Pearce, Balmain
 Ray Price, Parramatta, Wakefield Trinity
 Wally Prigg, St George
 Norm Provan, St George
 Johnny Raper, Newtown, St George
 Tom Raudonikis, Western Suburbs, Newtown
 Steve Roach, Balmain, Warrington
 Steve Rogers, Cronulla-Sutherland, St. George, Widnes
 Albert Rosenfeld, Eastern Suburbs, Huddersfield, Wakefield Trinity, Bradford Northern
 John Sattler, South Sydney
 Billy Smith, St George
 Ray Stehr, Eastern Suburbs 
 Herb Steinohrt, Toowoomba
 Peter Sterling, Parramatta, Hull FC
 Arthur Summons, Western Suburbs
 Viv Thicknesse, Eastern Suburbs
 Duncan Thompson, North Sydney, Toowoomba
 Ken Thornett, Parramatta, Leeds
 George Treweek, South Sydney
 Ian Walsh, Eugowra, St George
 Steve Walters, Canberra, North Queensland Cowboys, Newcastle Knights
 Benny Wearing, South Sydney
 Shane Webcke, Brisbane Broncos
 Eric Weissel, Cootamundra, Temora, Barmedman, Narrandera, Wagga Wagga
 Harry Wells, Wollongong, South Sydney, Western Suburbs

Players by club

NSWRL/ARL/NRL

Brisbane Rugby League

Other

Eugowra 1

See also
Australian rugby league team of the century
List of Australia national rugby league team players

External links
Centenary of Rugby League
Rugby League's Greatest Players Announced Centenary of Rugby League, accessed 23 February 2008
League's 100 greatest players Fox Sports, accessed 23 February 2008
UK Stars Make Aussie Greats List Sporting Life, accessed 23 February 2008

 
Top sports lists
National Rugby League
Lists of Australian rugby league players